Draga Bašćanska is a village in Croatia at the island of Krk (Otok Krk, isola di Velia). It is connected by the D102 highway. Fiesta is St. Ročo (San Rocco) 16-Aug.
Typical products are honey and goat cheese.

Populated places in Primorje-Gorski Kotar County
Krk